, formerly , is a Japanese idol girl group produced by Yasushi Akimoto. The group was created on August 21, 2015, becoming Nogizaka46's first sister group under the Sakamichi Series. Following the resignation of group's center Yurina Hirate and other main members, the group was rebranded as Sakurazaka46 after their last concert on October 13, 2020. The group's fans are known as Buddies.

As Keyakizaka46, the group had released nine singles, eight of which topped the Oricon Singles Chart and Billboard Japan Hot 100.  The group had also released three compilation albums, one of which was released by Hiragana Keyakizaka46, a subgroup who later became an independent group, Hinatazaka46. Additionally, the group hosts multiple variety shows, radio programs, and television dramas.

History

2015: Formation 
On February 22, 2015, during the Nogizaka46 3rd Year Birthday Live at Seibu Dome, Nogizaka46 announced plans to recruit the first generation members for their new project. The final stage of the audition took place on August 21, the same day Nogizaka46 was created four years earlier, and 22 were selected out of 22,509 candidates. At the same time, it was announced that the group's name was suddenly changed to Keyakizaka46; however, its reason is unclear. Furthermore, two members, Mizuho Suzuki and Mayu Harada, left the group before their first performance, bringing the total number of members to 20.

Similar to Nogizaka46, Keyakizaka46 began airing a television show on October 4 titled  on TV Tokyo. On November 29, the show announced a new member, Neru Nagahama. Nagahama had passed the auditions but did not join due to her parents' objections. She debuted as a member of the newly-formed subgroup  and auditions for more members started soon after.

On December 16, the group gave its first live performance at Fuji TV's music show FNS Music Festival. The center position in the choreography was held by the youngest member Yurina Hirate, being 14 at the time.

2016–2017: Early success 
On April 6, 2016, the group debuted their first single, Silent Majority. All members except Neru Nagahama were selected to perform in the title song. It sold 261,580 copies in the first week and ranked first on the Oricon weekly chart. The single also broke the debut week sales record for female artists, previously held by HKT48 with their single Suki! Suki! Skip!.

Between April and May, eighteen people auditioning for Hiragana Keyakizaka46 live streamed on Showroom as part of the audition process. Eleven of those passed and became official members, joining Neru Nagahama. The expanded subunit performed "Hiragana Keyaki" as part of Keyakizaka46's second single, Sekai ni wa Ai Shika Nai.

Keyakizaka46's first featured drama Tokuyama Daigorō o Dare ga Koroshitaka? premiered on the TX network on July 16, 2016. Sekai ni wa Ai Shika Nai was used as the theme song. The group was also featured in KeyaBingo!, a variety show similar to AKBingo! and NogiBingo!

2016 marked the first time the group appeared on NHK Kōhaku Uta Gassen, an event that the group participated in every year since. Additionally, Mizuho Habu became the first member to make a runway debut, appearing in GirlsAward 2016 Spring/Summer. Three more members, Yurina Hirate, Yui Kobayashi, and Risa Watanabe, would later make their debuts in GirlsAward 2016 Autumn/Winter.

In January 2017, Yūka Sugai and Akane Moriya were pointed as captain and vice-captain of the group, respectively. In July, Hiragana Keyakizaka46 added a second generation, with nine new members. The subgroup was featured on Re:Mind, a TV thriller series aired on Netflix.
In August, Keyakizaka46 made their first performance at the Rock in Japan Festival, and have appeared in every year since.

2018–2020: Member departures and rebranding 
In 2018, Yui Imaizumi became the first member to leave the group, intending to pursue other forms of entertainment. Afterwards, more members left the group, including Nanami Yonetani and Manaka Shida in 2018 and Neru Nagahama in 2019. Meanwhile, on November 29, 2018, Nogizaka46 and Keyakizaka46 held joint audition, where thirty-nine people passed. Out of those members, eleven went to Nogizaka46, nine went to Kanji Keyakizaka46, one went to Hiragana Keyakizaka46, and the remaining fifteen became  that are not assigned to any group. Shortly afterwards, Hiragana Keyakizaka46 formed an independent group known as Hinatazaka46, and released their debut single, "Kyun", in March 2019.

During this time, Keyakizaka46 still held multiple concerts, including their largest one September 18–19, 2019 at Tokyo Dome, attracting roughly 50,000 fans per day. On September 24, a rhythm game titled Uni's On Air was released that featured Keyakizaka46 and Hinatazaka46.

Keyakizaka46, for the very first time, applied the senbatsu (selection of members) system for their 9th single during Keyakitte, Kakenai? on September 8, 2019. Historically, the senbatsu included every single member, but after the addition of the second generation, not all members were allowed to participate in the 9th single. Originally set to be released at the end of the year, the release was first delayed due to production issues, and then further delayed with the sudden departure of Yurina Hirate in January 2020, the 9th single's planned center.

On February 16, 2020, the remaining fourteen kenshūsei members were assigned to their respective Sakamichi Series group through Showroom. Six of these members became part of Keyakizaka46's second generation.

On July 16, 2020, Keyakizaka46 live streamed a concert titled Keyakizaka46 Live Online, but with YOU! The concert was the first one held since their Tokyo Dome concert in September 2019 and the first without Yurina Hirate. During the concert, the group unveiled their last single "Dare ga Sono Kane o Narasu no ka?", which is scheduled to be released digitally only on August 21. Additionally, captain Yūka Sugai announced that Keyakizaka46 would end its five year journey and its members would start over under a new name, with a final concert planned in October. On September 21, it was announced Sakurazaka46 would be their new name, with the change occurring after their last concert on October 12 and 13. Sakurazaka46 is named after Sakurazaka street within Roppongi Hills in Minato, Tokyo, located next to Keyakizaka street. Sakura (cherry tree) is written in the kyūjitai form  instead of the more common .

2020–present: Restarting as Sakurazaka46 
Following their farewell concert on October 14, 2020, the group officially changed its name to Sakurazaka46. Their weekly variety show Keyakitte, Kakenai? was renamed to Soko Magattara, Sakurazaka?. Their first single under the new name, Nobody's Fault, was released on December 9. Only 14 members performed in the title track. Additionally, this single saw the creation of the "Sakura Eight", the eight members in the first two rows. Members featured on Sakura EIght appear in every B-side. "Nobody's Fault" was performed in the 71st NHK Kōhaku Uta Gassen.

On January 4, 2021, Rina Matsuda replaced Akane Moriya as vice-captain of the group; Yūka Sugai remained as captain. On March 14, Matsudaira Riko left the group. On April 14, the 2nd single "Ban" was reIeased. In June, the group held a three day concert Backs Live, in which non-Sakura Eight members performed without the Sakura Eight, taking their positions. In July, Sakurazaka46 held their first joint concert with Hinatazaka46 (since Hinatazaka46's rename), W-Keyaki Fes 2021 at Fuji Q Highland. In October, Rika Watanabe and Akane Moriya announced departure from the group, and left on December 10 after their final concert. On November 9, Yūka Sugai left the group after their first Tokyo Dome concert as Sakurazaka46 and Rina Matsuda succeeded her as captain.

Controversy 
In 2016, Keyakizaka46 was criticized by the Simon Wiesenthal Center for wearing outfits resembling the Schutzstaffel military uniforms of Nazi Germany at a concert. Sony Music responded with an official apology.

Members 
Since its founding, Sakurazaka46 has had a total of 70 members from five generations, including members from Hiragana Keyakizaka46 (now Hinatazaka46). 30 of those members are still in the group.

If second generation members are marked with an asterisk (*), it means that they joined after the initial second generation members on February 15, 2020.

Former members

Membership Timeline

Discography

Studio albums

Compilation albums

Video albums

Singles

Promotional singles

Guest appearances

Other charted songs

Filmography

Television shows

Radio shows

Awards

Notes

References

External links 

  

 
Japanese idol groups
Japanese girl groups
Musical groups established in 2015
2015 establishments in Japan
Musical groups established in 2020
2020 establishments in Japan
Sony Music Entertainment Japan artists
Japanese pop music groups
Musical groups from Tokyo
Sakamichi Series